Olympia (1946–1974) was an American Thoroughbred racehorse who won top races at age two through four then became a foundation sire for Florida breeder, Fred W. Hooper. Bred by Hall of Fame jockey turned trainer, Ivan H. Parke, he was
sired by Champion sire Heliopolis and out of the mare, Miss Dolphin.

After a very successful two-year-old season, Olympia won the San Felipe Stakes, the Flamingo Stakes, the Wood Memorial Stakes and the Derby Trial Stakes that resulted in him being sent off as the heavy betting favorite for the 1949 Kentucky Derby, in which he finished sixth.

Olympia developed into a top class sprinter who retired from racing with a record of 15-12-4 in 41 starts, and earnings of $365,632.

Champion broodmare sire
Olympia was retired to stud duty. He stood at Danada Farm in Lexington, Kentucky but on his death at age 28 in 1974 was buried at Hooper Farm in Ocala, Florida.

Among his successful progeny were two Eclipse Award winners. Decathlon (f. 1953) was voted the American Champion Sprint Horse in 1956 and 1957 and Pucker Up (foaled  in 1953) the 1957 American Champion Older Female Horse. Olympia's other good runners included:
 Air Pilot (foaled in 1954), two-time winner of the Massachusetts Handicap
 Alhambra (foaled in 1955), multiple stakes winner
 Talent Show (foaled in 1955), multiple stakes winner who earned more than US$500,000
 Winonly (foaled in 1957), multiple stakes winner 
 Editorialist (foaled in 1958), multiple stakes winner 
 Top Bid (foaled in 1964).  the 1973 American Grand National winner, 1970 American Champion Steeplechase Horse
 My Portrait (foaled in 1958), won 1961 Kentucky Oaks

Olympia was the damsire of Darby Dan Farm's very good runner True Knight (foaled in 1969) who was instrumental in Olympia becoming the 1974 Leading broodmare sire in North America.

References

1946 racehorse births
1974 racehorse deaths
Racehorses bred in the United States
Racehorses trained in the United States
United States Champion Thoroughbred Sires
American Champion Thoroughbred broodmare sires
Thoroughbred family 4-o
Chefs-de-Race